Lopez Jaena, officially the Municipality of Lopez Jaena, is a 4th class municipality in the province of Misamis Occidental, Philippines. According to the 2020 census, it has a population of 25,507 people.

Geography

Climate

Barangays
Lopez Jaena is politically subdivided into 28 barangays.

Demographics

Economy

References

External links 
 [ Philippine Standard Geographic Code]
 Philippine Census Information
 Local Governance Performance Management System

Municipalities of Misamis Occidental